San Miguel Tlacotepec is a town and municipality in Oaxaca in south-western Mexico. The municipality covers an area of 112.27 km² and is part of the Juxtlahuaca district of the Mixteca Region.

As of 2005, the municipality had a total population of 3307.

References

Municipalities of Oaxaca